Bosa is a town and comune in the Sardinia region of Italy.

Bosa may also refer to:

People
 Bosa of York, 7th century Bishop of York
 David Bosa (born 1992), Italian speed skater
 Joey Bosa (born 1995), American football defensive end
 John Bosa (born 1964), American football defensive tackle
 Nick Bosa (born 1997), American football defensive end
 Peter Bosa (1927–1998), Canadian politician

Other uses
 Bosa (Bogotá), a locality of Bogotá, Colombia
 Boza, also Bosa, a fermented drink made from maize or wheat
 Bi-directional optical sub-assembly, a type of electro-optical component

See also
 Bossa nova, a genre of Brazilian music